The Braldu River flows in the Skardu District of Gilgit Baltistan in Pakistan. The Braldu River joins the Basha Basna River, and together they form the Shigar River, which is a tributary of the Indus River.

Geography 
The Baltoro Glacier and the Biafo Glacier are among the largest glaciers outside the polar regions. The Baltoro Glacier give rise to the four Eight-thousanders mountain peaks, among them is the K2 , the second highest mountain peak of the world. The Biafo Glacier holds the Snow Lake, which is 61 mile (100 km) river of ice, it is among the world's longest continuous glacier systems outside of the polar regions.

The Braldu River flows almost eastwards, entirely in the Skardu District of Baltistan and forms the Braldu Valley. The most remote settlement in the valley is the village of Askole, situated at the right bank of the Braldu River. Askole serves as the base camp for mountaineering expeditions and trekking to the various glaciers in this Karakoram Range. Many glacier fed streams joins the Braldu River in the Braldu Valley.

The Braldu River flows through the towns of Korphe, Shamang, Barjand, Kharwa, Niyil and Tingstun. It merges with the Basha Basna River  before Tingstun to form the Shigar River at the end of the Braldu Valley. The Basha Basna River originates from the Chogo Lungma and the Sokha Glaciers, flows southeastwards. The Shigar River joins the Indus River at Skardu,  from the merger of the Braldu River and the Basha Basna River.

Kayaking 
The Braldu River is considered to be a super extreme whitewater river. It provides great scope for kayaking, which is practised during the summer from June to August. The first attempt to kayak the river was made in 1978 by a British expedition led by Mike Jones. Jones lost his life trying to rescue a team mate, for which he was awarded the Queen's Gallantry Medal (QGM).

Image gallery

References 

Himalayas
Rivers of Gilgit-Baltistan
Indus basin
Karakoram
Skardu District
Rivers of Pakistan